This is a list of rivers of Martinique. Rivers are listed in clockwise order, starting at the north end of the island.

Grande Rivière
Rivière Roche
Rivière Capot
Rivière Falaise
Rivière du Lorrain
Rivière du Galion
Rivière Desroses
Rivière Pilote
Rivière Salée
Lézarde
Rivière Blanche
Rivière Monsieur
Rivière Madame
Rivière de Fond Bourlet
Rivière du Carbet
Roxelane
Rivière des Pères
Rivière Sèche
Rivière Claire
Rivière de l'Anse Céron

References
Sandre
 GEOnet Names Server
NOAA map

Rivers
Martinique